The Suite for Jazz Orchestra No. 2 is a suite by Dmitri Shostakovich. It was written in 1938 for the newly founded State Jazz Orchestra of Victor Knushevitsky, and was premiered on 28 November 1938 in Moscow (Moscow Radio) by the State Jazz Orchestra.  The score was lost during World War II, but a piano score of the work was rediscovered in 1999 by Manashir Yakubov.  Three movements of the suite were reconstructed and orchestrated by Gerard McBurney, and were premiered at a The Proms in London in 2000.

The Suite, in its reconstructed form, consists of the following movements:

Prior to its rediscovery, another eight-movement suite by Shostakovich had been misidentified and recorded as the second Jazz Suite.  That work is now correctly known as the Suite for Variety Orchestra.

See also
 Suite for Jazz Orchestra No. 1 (Shostakovich)
 Suite for Variety Orchestra (Shostakovich)

References

External links
 Publisher's page of the Suite for Jazz Orchestra No. 2
 Sikorski's Shostakovich Catalogue
The premiere of the suite on BBC Proms Premiere of the 2nd Jazz suite.

Jazz Orchestra No. 2
1938 compositions